HMS Exeter was a 64-gun third rate ship of the line of the Royal Navy, launched on 26 July 1763 at Chatham Dockyard.

In 1782, Exeter was involved in the battles of Sadras, Providien, Negapatam and Trincomalee, and the Battle of Cuddalore in 1783.

In 1783, after peace returned between France and England and the British squadron was recalled, Exeter ran aground arriving at the Cape of Good Hope. The French squadron under Suffren had been anchored there for a few days, and both the British and French ships launched their boats to provide assistance.

In 1784 she was found to be unseaworthy, and was burned.

Notes

References

External links
 HMS Exeter entry in the shipwreck database of the South African Heritage Resources Agency

Ships of the line of the Royal Navy
Exeter-class ships of the line
1763 ships